Tabulaephorus sesamitis is a moth of the family Pterophoridae. It is found in India and eastern Afghanistan.

References

Moths described in 1905
Pterophorini
Moths of Asia